The Barna baril (Opsarius barna) is a fish in genus Opsarius of the family Cyprinidae. It is found in India, Nepal, Bangladesh and Myanmar.

Description
This species can grow to around 15 cm and inhabits clear gravelly hill streams.

References 

Opsarius
Fish of Bangladesh
Fish of India
Fish described in 1822